Vekkali Amman Temple is a temple dedicated to the Goddess Vekkaali, a form of the goddess Kali. It is located in Woraiyur, a neighbourhood in Tiruchirappalli, Tamil Nadu, India. The central shrine of the temple houses the image of Vekkali Amman and the major feature of the temple is the absence of roof over the sanctum. The temple is known from the period of early Cholas, but there are no historical records. The people of Woraiyur see Vekkali Amman as their guardian deity. The temple has six daily rituals in its calendar and celebrates six annual festivals. The temple chariot is made of gold and was launched during 2010. The temple is maintained and administered by the Hindu Religious and Endowment Board of the Government of Tamil Nadu.

Religious significance

The roof over the sanctum was constructed during different times, but is believed to be burnt by the power of Vekkali Amman. The position of the leg of Vekkali Amman is different from other Shakti temples without roof where the right leg is placed over demon. As per Hindu legend, the position requires lot of energy and while Nataraja, during his dance switched his legs, Vekkali Amman remained in the position to show her energy levels. The posture is also believed to signify kindness, love, affection and compassion to her devotees. Historically, temples facing north, are considered to provide victories on endeavours. The Cholas worshipped the deity before proceeding to military campaign. 
The people of Woraiyur see Vekkali Amman as the saviour deity during difficult times.

Festivals and religious practises

The temple priests perform the puja (rituals) during festivals and on a daily basis. The temple rituals are performed seven times a day; Visvarupa at 5:15 a.m., morning abhishekam at 5:30 a.m., Deepa darisanam at 6:15 a.m., Uchikalam at 12:00 p.m., Uchikaladeepa at 1:00 p.m, Maalai Tharisanam at 7:00 p.m. and Ardha Jamam at 9:00 p.m. Each ritual comprises three steps: alangaram (decoration), naivethyam (food offering) and deepa aradanai (waving of lamps) for Vekkali Amman. The worship is held amidst music with nagaswaram (pipe instrument) and tavil (percussion instrument), religious instructions in the Vedas (sacred text) read by priests and prostration by worshippers in front of the temple mast. There are weekly, monthly and fortnightly rituals.

Chittirai festival held during April–May, Panguni Poochoridal in March–April, Mango ablution on the last Friday of Tamil month of Vaikasi (May–June), Navarathri in Purattasi (September–October), Thai Velli (Fridays of January–February) and Fridays and Aadi velli (Fridays of July–August) are the festivals celebrated in the temple.

The temple implements the Annadhanam scheme as a part of the Tamil Nadu government's initiative to provide free food daily to devotees. Under the initiative, free food is provided to fifty devotees every day.

References

External links
 Official temple website

Hindu temples in Tiruchirappalli
Kali temples